"4-Day Weekend" is a song by English indie rock band The Bluetones, released as the fourth and final single in 1998 from their second album, Return to the Last Chance Saloon. The single was available by mail-order only, hence it did not chart, but it was subsequently included on the band's 2006 compilation A Rough Outline: The Singles & B-Sides 95 - 03.  The music video is in an anime style, the production of which was supervised by Japanese anime director Kōji Morimoto, and animated by Studio 4°C. It was included as multimedia content on its original CD release.

Track listing
CD / 12"
"4-Day Weekend"
"Mr. Soul"
"Pretty Ballerina"

7"
"4-Day Weekend"
"Mr. Soul"

An edited version of Pretty Ballerina removing the band intros is on The Singles & A Rough Outline: The Singles & B-Sides 95 - 03.

References

The Bluetones songs
1998 singles
Song recordings produced by Hugh Jones (producer)
1998 songs
Animated music videos
A&M Records singles
Songs written by Eds Chesters
Songs written by Adam Devlin
Songs written by Mark Morriss
Songs written by Scott Morriss